Jadwisin may refer to the following places in Poland:
Jadwisin, Lower Silesian Voivodeship (south-west Poland)
Jadwisin, Łódź Voivodeship (central Poland)
Jadwisin, Łuków County in Lublin Voivodeship (east Poland)
Jadwisin, Świdnik County in Lublin Voivodeship (east Poland)
Jadwisin, Legionowo County in Masovian Voivodeship (east-central Poland)
Jadwisin, Sokołów County in Masovian Voivodeship (east-central Poland)
Jadwisin, Wołomin County in Masovian Voivodeship (east-central Poland)